Suck on This is a live album by the American rock band Primus, released in 1989. At the time of recording, the featured lineup of 
bassist/vocalist Les Claypool, guitarist Larry LaLonde and drummer Tim Alexander had only been playing together for "about two months". This release, along with Jane's Addiction's self-titled live album, are seen as popularizing the then-underground alternative metal genre.

Background 
The album was recorded live at the Berkeley Square in Berkeley, California on February 25 and March 5, 1989, on a TASCAM quarter-inch 8-track Portastudio and mixed on Hi-Fi VHS. The band borrowed $3,000 from Claypool's father to cover the recording and pressing of one thousand copies of the album for its initial limited run. They released the record in November 1989 through their own independent label under the name Prawn Song Records before licensing it to Caroline Records in 1990, and later Interscope Records. On April 23, 2002, Prawn Song reissued the album with remastered audio, together with the follow-up studio album Frizzle Fry.

All of the songs would eventually be released as studio recordings: "Tommy the Cat" on Sailing the Seas of Cheese in 1991, "Pressman" (as "The Pressman") on Pork Soda in 1993, "Jellikit" on the Airheads soundtrack in 1994 as "Bastardizing Jellikit", and "The Heckler" on Antipop in 1999 as a hidden track. All other tracks were included on the band's debut studio album Frizzle Fry in 1990.

The original liner notes give "hugs and kisses" to a number of bands and local businesses, including Faith No More and Buck Naked and the Bare Bottom Boys, followed by "special hugs and kisses" to a number of individuals, including early Primus members Todd Huth, Jay Lane, Vince Parker and Tim Wright, and "Pops" (Claypool's father) "for kickin' down the corn". For the 2002 reissue, these sections were omitted in favour of a paragraph written by Claypool detailing the history of the record, leaving only "special thanks" to Claypool's father.

Critical reception 

Reviewing the album for AllMusic, Ned Raggett describes the album as "not only demonstrating Primus' undeniable live flair for art/prog rock/funk of its own devising, but capturing an already rabid fan base getting off on it big-time", with "its tempo-shifting riffing and Funkadelic-meets-Rush rhythm explosions benefiting from a fairly crisp recording." He notes that "Claypool's voice is sometimes searching for breath or a touch buried in the mix", but "anyone who likes the Zappa/Beefheart goofy voice approach Claypool is fond of will be perfectly happy with his nutty lip-flapping".

Track listing

Personnel 
Primus
 Les Claypool – bass guitar, vocals
 Larry "Ler" LaLonde – guitars
 Tim "Herb" Alexander – drums

Production
 Matt Winegar – producer, engineer, mixing engineer
 Howard Johnston – editing
 Tim "Soya" – stage
 Leroy – stage
 Lauren Miller – live sound

Visual art
 Paul Haggard – jacket design, photos
 Lance "Link" Montoya – sculpture

References 

Albums with cover art by Lance Montoya
1989 live albums
Prawn Song Records live albums
Primus (band) albums